

This page lists board and card games, wargames, miniatures games, and tabletop role-playing games published in 1979.  For video games, see 1979 in video gaming.

Games released or invented in 1979

Games awards given in 1979
 Spiel des Jahres: Hare and Tortoise (first year given)

Significant games-related events of 1979
Task Force Games founded by Allen Eldridge and Stephen Cole.

See also
 1979 in video gaming

Games
Games by year